In Greek mythology, the Suitors of Helen are those who came from many kingdoms of Greece to compete for the hand of the Spartan princess Helen, daughter of Zeus and Leda.

Mythology

Selection of the husband 
When it was time for Helen to marry, many kings and princes from around the world came to seek her hand, bringing rich gifts with them, or sent emissaries to do so on their behalf. During the contest, Castor and Pollux had a prominent role in dealing with the suitors, although the final decision was in the hands of Tyndareus. Her future husband Menelaus did not attend but sent his brother Agamemnon to represent him.

There are three available and not entirely consistent lists of suitors, compiled by Pseudo-Apollodorus (31 suitors), Hesiod (12 suitors), and Hyginus (36 suitors), for a total of 45 distinct names.  There are only fragments from Hesiod's poem, so his list would have contained more. Achilles' absence from the lists is conspicuous, but Hesiod explains that he was too young to take part in the contest. Taken together, the list of suitors matches well with the captains in the Catalog of Ships from the Iliad; however, some of the names may have been placed in the list of Helen's suitors simply because they went to Troy. It is not unlikely that relatives of a suitor may have joined the war.

Name of suitors

Oath of Tyndareus 
Tyndareus was afraid to select a husband for his daughter, or send any of the suitors away, for fear of offending them and giving grounds for a quarrel. Odysseus was one of the suitors, but had brought no gifts because he believed he had little chance to win the contest. He thus promised to solve the problem, if Tyndareus in turn would support him in his courting of Penelope, the daughter of Icarius. Tyndareus readily agreed, and Odysseus proposed that, before the decision was made, all the suitors should swear a most solemn oath to defend the chosen husband against whoever should quarrel with him. After the suitors had sworn not to retaliate, Menelaus was chosen to be Helen's husband. As a sign of the importance of the pact, Tyndareus sacrificed a horse.

See also 
 Achaean Leaders

References

 
Characters in Greek mythology